Bangerter is a surname. Notable people with the surname include:

Hans Bangerter (1924–2022), Swiss UEFA official
Jack Bangerter (1925–2008), American politician
Liz Bangerter (born 1974), American politician
Michael Bangerter (1936–2016), actor in A Bridge Too Far
Norman H. Bangerter (1933–2015), American politician
William Grant Bangerter (1918–2010), American Mormon missionary

It could also refer to Bangerter Highway (UT-154), a state highway in Utah named after Norman Bangerter.